Joseph, Duke of Parma and Piacenza (Italian: Giuseppe Maria Pietro Paolo Francesco Roberto Tomaso-d'Aquino Andrea-Avellino Biagio Mauro Carlo Stanislao Luigi Filippo-Neri Leone Bernardo Antonio Ferdinando di Borbone-Parma e Piacenza; 30 June 1875 Biarritz – 7 January 1950 Pianore, Lucca, Italy) was the head of the House of Bourbon-Parma and the pretender to the defunct throne of Parma from 1939 to 1950.

Life
Prince Giuseppe was born as the third but second surviving son of Robert I, Duke of Parma and his first wife, Princess Maria Pia of Bourbon-Two Sicilies. Like his older brother and predecessor, Enrico, he had an intellectual disability and was the titular pretender of Parma from 1939 until 1950.

His younger brother and successor, Elias, took up the role as head of the family in 1907 and acted as regent, although Giuseppe continued to be considered by monarchists as Joseph I of Parma. Giuseppe died unmarried and without issue and was succeeded as titular pretender of Parma by his brother Elias upon his death in 1950.

Ancestry

See also
Duchy of Parma
House of Bourbon-Parma

 

  

Pretenders to the throne of Parma
Regents of Parma
Dukes of Parma
Princes of Bourbon-Parma
Princes of Parma and Piacenza
Joseph I
Knights of the Golden Fleece
Joseph I of Parma
Joseph I of Parma
Sons of monarchs